SS Iron Crown was a  Australian iron ore carrier  which was sunk during World War II by a Japanese submarine.

History
Iron Crown was built at Williamstown Dockyard as part of the Commonwealth line of steamers for the Australian Commonwealth Shipping Board. She was launched on 27 January 1922 as Euroa, before being renamed Iron Crown in December 1923 and homeported in Sydney under the British Flag.

On 4 June 1942, Iron Crown, while en route from Whyalla in South Australia to Newcastle in New South Wales, was torpedoed and sunk  SSW of Gabo Island by I-27. Out of her 43 crew members whom she was carrying, 38 were killed, with the survivors being picked up by SS Mulbera.

George Fisher, the last survivor, who was aged 18 when the ship sank, died in 2012.

Wreckage discovery
In April 2019, it was announced that the wreckage of Iron Crown had been located by marine archaeologists aboard CSIRO research vessel RV Investigator in 700 metres of water around 100 km off the coast of Victoria.

Official number and code letters
Official numbers were a forerunner to IMO Numbers. Iron Crown had the UK Official Number 151806 and used the Code Letters VJDK.

References

External links
Australian National Shipwreck Database: SS IRON CROWN

1922 ships
Ships built in Victoria (Australia)
Ships sunk by Japanese submarines
World War II shipwrecks in the Pacific Ocean
World War II merchant ships of Australia
Maritime incidents in June 1942
Ships of BHP Shipping
Shipwrecks of Victoria (Australia)